Lake Landing Historic District is a national historic district located near Lake Landing, Hyde County, North Carolina. The district encompasses 226 contributing buildings, 2 contributing sites, and 4 contributing structures related to agricultural complexes near Lake Landing.  The district includes notable examples of Greek Revival, Queen Anne, and Coastal Cottage style architecture dating from about 1785 to the early-20th century. The Dr. William Sparrow octagon house, also known as Inkwell, is listed separately.  Other notable buildings include the Fulford-Watson House, Gibbs Family House, Young-Roper-Jarvis House, Joseph Young House, Swindell-Mann-Clarke House, Amity Methodist Church, Chapel Hill Academy, St. George's Episcopal Church, John Edward Spencer Store, and George Israel Watson House (1896).

It was added to the National Register of Historic Places in 1986.

References

Historic districts on the National Register of Historic Places in North Carolina
Greek Revival architecture in North Carolina
Queen Anne architecture in North Carolina
Buildings and structures in Hyde County, North Carolina
National Register of Historic Places in Hyde County, North Carolina